The 2016–17 Ole Miss Rebels women's basketball team represented University of Mississippi during the 2016–17 NCAA Division I women's basketball season. The Rebels, led by fourth year head coach Matt Insell, played their home games at the Pavilion at Ole Miss and are members of the Southeastern Conference (SEC). They finished the season 17–14, 6–10 in SEC play to finish in tenth place. They lost in the second round of the SEC women's basketball tournament to LSU. They were invited to the Women's National Invitation Tournament where they got upset by Grambling State in the first round.

Roster

Schedule

|-
!colspan=9 style="background:#; color:white;"| Exhibition

|-
!colspan=9 style="background:#; color:white;"| Non-conference regular season

|-
!colspan=9 style="background:#; color:white;"| SEC regular season

|-
!colspan=9 style="background:#; color:white;"| SEC Women's Tournament

|-
!colspan=9 style="background:#; color:white;"| WNIT

Rankings

See also
2016–17 Ole Miss Rebels men's basketball team

References

Ole Miss Rebels women's basketball seasons
Ole Miss
2017 Women's National Invitation Tournament participants
Ole Miss Rebels
Ole Miss Rebels